Hockey Club Klein Zwitserland, commonly known as Klein Zwitserland, is a Dutch field hockey club based in The Hague, South Holland. 

The women and men's first team compete in the hoofdklasse, the highest league of Dutch field hockey.

The club was founded on 20 September 1908. They were incredibly successful during the 1970s, winning 8 national titles in a row. The first men team played continuously on the highest level of Dutch hockey from 1974 until 2007. After promoting twice in a row they're back in the hoofdklasse since 2018.

Honours

Men
Hoofdklasse
 Winners (8): 1976–77, 1977–78, 1978–79, 1979–80, 1980–81, 1981–82, 1982–83, 1983–84
 Runners-up (2): 1974–75, 1975–76 :
Gold Cup
 Winners (1): 2021–22
EuroHockey Club Champions Cup:
 Winners (2): 1979, 1981
 Runners-up (4): 1980, 1982, 1983, 1985
Hoofdklasse Indoor
 Winners (2): 1974–75, 1982–83

Players

Current squad

Men's squad
Head coach: Omar Schlingemann

Notable players

Men's internationals

/
 Brett Garrard

 Maximiliano Caldas
Nicolas Keenan

 Grant Schubert

 Gagan Ajit Singh
 Dilip Tirkey

 Steven van Randwijck

Women's internationals

 Naomi van As
 Merel de Blaeij
 Eveline de Haan
 Femke Kooijman
 Leonoor Voskamp

 Alyson Annan
/
 Alex Danson

References

External links
  Official website HC Klein Zwitserland

 
Dutch field hockey clubs
Field hockey clubs established in 1908
1908 establishments in the Netherlands
Sports clubs in The Hague